The loggerhead sea turtle, is protected under the Endangered Species Act (ESA) of 1973. It was originally listed as a threatened species on July 28, 1978. The turtle's status was updated to Vulnerable (VU) on August 23, 2018. The loggerhead turtle is the most prolific species of sea turtle in U.S. coastal waters.

Background: Distinct population segments (DPS) 
The loggerhead sea turtle (Caretta caretta) is geographically distributed into nine distinct population segments(DPS). The National Marine Fisheries Service (NMFS), National Oceanic and Atmospheric Administration (NOAA), the U.S. Fish and Wildlife Services (USFWS), and the Department of the Interior ruled four DPSs as threatened and five DPSs as endangered effective on October 24, 2011. Loggerhead DPSs listed as threatened under the jurisdiction of the Secretary of Commerce are:  
 Northwestern Atlantic Ocean DPS  
 South Atlantic Ocean DPS 
 Southeast Indo-Pacific Ocean DPS  
 Southwest Indian Ocean DPS .  
Endangered populations of loggerhead sea turtles are:  
 Mediterranean Sea DPS 
 North Indian Ocean DPS  
 North Pacific Ocean DPS 
 Northeast Atlantic Ocean DPS 
 South Pacific Ocean DPS 
The two of these distinct population segments of loggerhead sea turtles that fall within United States Territory are the North Pacific Ocean DPS (range defined as north of the equator and south of 60°N lat.) and the Northwest Atlantic Ocean DPS (range defined as north of the equator, south of 60°N lat., and west of 40°W. long.).

North Pacific Ocean DPS 

Off the coast of southern California NMFS, NOAA, and Department of Commerce prohibited fishing with large drift gillnet (DGN) gear in the loggerhead conservation area during the presence of El Niño conditions in order to protect the endangered North Pacific Ocean loggerhead DPS. This ruling effective July 23, 2014 was intended to prevent bycatch of loggerhead sea turtles. A team including sea turtle biologists and oceanographers determined the presence of El Niño conditions based on the “El Niño watch” issued by the Climate Prediction Center (CPC), anomalies found in sea surface temperature (SST) charts published by NOAA's Coast Watch Program, the presence of loggerhead sea turtles in the Pacific loggerhead conservation area, and reports of loggerhead strandings. The SST data showed higher than average temperatures during summer months off the coast of southern California. This same fisheries closure ruling due to El Niño conditions was again implemented May 29, 2015, and then again June 1, 2016.

Northwest Atlantic Ocean DPS 

Critical habitat designation for the Northwest Atlantic Ocean DPS of loggerhead sea turtles specified 38 marine areas that include nearshore reproductive habitat, breeding areas, winter area, constricted migratory corridors, and Sargassum habitat. This ruling was made the NMFS, NOAA, and Department of Commerce effective August 11, 2014. Nesting beaches were identified as critical terrestrial habitat by Fish and Wildlife Services and the Department of the Interior within the Atlantic Ocean and Gulf of Mexico, effective August 11, 2014.  The 2012 BiOp is an integral component to managing the shallow-set fishery, because the one-year incidental take statement (ITS, including reasonable and prudent management measures, and terms and conditions) forms the basis for regulations that specify the annual limits on leatherback and North Pacific loggerhead sea turtle interactions with the fishery that are necessary to manage the impacts of the fishery on sea turtles.

Hawaii-based pelagic shallow-set longline fisheries 

Effective January 11, 2010 the NMFS, NOAA, and Department of Commerce removed the limit on the number of fishing gear deployments for the Hawaii-based pelagic shallow-set longline fisheries and simultaneously increased the number of incidental interactions allowed with loggerhead sea turtles. This ruling stated that longline fisheries may not interact with over 46 loggerhead sea turtles a year, a number thought to not interfere with survival and recovery of loggerhead sea turtles. This ruling was revised March 10, 2011 to reduce the number of allowed interactions from 46 a year to 17, a revision aimed to protect the loggerheads and maintain fishery yield. November 18, 2011 the pelagic shallow-set longline fisheries in Hawaii reached the annual limit on physical interactions with turtles and was closed by NMFS. Incidental interaction limit for loggerhead turtles was increased from 17 to 34 interactions a year starting November 5, 2012.

References 

Environmental policy in the United States
Turtles of North America
Sea turtles
Endangered fauna of North America
Caretta
Public policy of the Obama administration
Science and law
Convention on the Conservation of Migratory Species of Wild Animals
Turtle conservation